Omeo Kumar Das Institute of Social Change and Development is an autonomous Institute situated in Guwahati, Assam. It was established in 1989 under the joint initiative of Government of Assam and Indian Council of Social Science Research (ICSSR), New Delhi. It promotes and coordinates research on problems and processes of social transformation and development of Assam and other States of the North Eastern region of India.

History
Formerly the instruction was known as the Institute for Social Change and Development, the Government of Assam renamed it after the first Education Minister of Assam, Omeo Kumar Das in 1995 as a mark of respect towards him on his birth centenary. The Chief Minister of Assam, Sri Tarun Gogoi, laid the foundation stone of the Institute on 13 April 2005 and inaugurated the building on 20 February 2009.

Programmes
PhD Programme
Post Graduate Certificate Course on North East India Studies
Research Methodology Course
Computer Application Course
Ph.D. Fellowship Programme
Visiting Fellows Programme
Training programmes
Data Consultancy
Lectures Seminars and Workshops

References

Research institutes in Assam
1989 establishments in Assam
Guwahati
Research institutes established in 1989